Several Canadian naval units have been named HMCS Gaspé;

 , a  that entered service in 1938 and was discarded in 1945.
 , a  that entered service in 1953 and was transferred to the Turkish Navy in 1958 and renamed Trabzon.

Battle honours

 Atlantic, 1939–45

References

 Government of Canada Ships' Histories - HMCS Gaspé

Royal Canadian Navy ship names